The 2011 Samarra bombing was an attack that took place in the city of Samarra on 12 February 2011. A suicide bomber detonated an explosives vest in a bus depot at the entry to the city as Shia pilgrims gathered to commemorate the death of one of their 12 revered imams. The attacker infiltrated the crowd at a security checkpoint before detonating his explosives, killing 48 and injuring 80. Local officials blamed al-Qaeda in Iraq.

See also

 List of terrorist incidents, 2011

References 

2011 murders in Iraq
Islamic terrorist incidents in 2011
Mass murder in 2011
2011 in Iraq
Terrorist incidents on buses in Asia
Suicide bombings in Iraq
Terrorist incidents in Iraq in 2011
Samarra
Violence against Shia Muslims in Iraq
February 2011 crimes
February 2011 events in Iraq
Building bombings in Iraq